"Walkaway" is the fourth single by Liverpool Britpop band Cast, fronted by ex-the La's bassist John Power. The song is taken from their debut album, All Change (1995), and reached number nine on the UK Singles Chart. "Walkaway" became Cast's highest-charting song in Ireland, where it reached number 23.

Track listings

Limited-edition 7-inch single
A1. "Walkaway"
A2. "Fulfill"
B1. "Finetime" (acoustic)

UK CD single
 "Walkaway"
 "Fulfill"
 "Mother"

European CD single
 "Walkaway"
 "Fulfill"

Australian CD single
 "Walkaway"
 "Fulfill"
 "Mother"
 "Finetime" (acoustic)

Personnel
Cast
 John Power – vocals, guitar
 Peter Wilkinson – backing vocals, bass
 Liam "Skin" Tyson – guitar
 Keith O'Neill – drums

Production
 John Leckie – producer
 Mark "Spike" Stent – mixing

Additional musicians
 Jonathan Stone – strings
 Vincent Needham – strings

Charts

Certifications

In popular culture
The song was featured in a controversial UK Ikea advert in 1999, where it was accused of glorifying divorce and extra marital affairs. The advert also features a rap verse.

The song was played on BBC One in 1996 after the England team were defeated by Germany during Euro 96.

References

1995 songs
1996 singles
Cast (band) songs
Polydor Records singles
Song recordings produced by John Leckie
Songs written by John Power (musician)